The Water Resources Secretary of Pakistan is the Federal Secretary for the Ministry of Water Resources. The position holder is a BPS-22 grade officer, usually belonging to the Pakistan Administrative Service. The Secretary is responsible for management of country's water resources, policy formulation & implementation . Notable organisations that come under the control of the Water Resources Secretary are Federal Flood Commission, Indus River System Authority (IRSA), Office of Pakistan Commissioner for Indus Waters and Water and Power Development Authority (WAPDA). The current Secretary of Water Resources Division is Muhammad Ashraf.

References

Ministry of Water Resources (Pakistan)